Kanchanpur District, a part of Sudurpashchim Province in the Terai plain, is one of seventy seven districts of Nepal. It is located in south-western of Nepal. It is bordered by Kailali district in the east, Dadeldhura district in the north and with India in the south and west.

Before the reunification of Nepal by Gorkha King Prithvi Narayan Shah, this district was part of the Doti Kingdom. Nepal lost it to the East India Company after the Anglo-Nepalese war (1814–1816). Then the Kingdom of Nepal and the East India Company followed by territorial concessions of Sugauli Treaty. Later on after the treaty of 1860, Nepal recovered this land along with Kailali, Banke and Bardiya. Its first headquarters was Belauri Municipality, and the current headquarter, Mahendranagr, was declared in 2019 B.S.

The majority of the population is ethnic Tharu community, and minor groups are the peoples that have migrated from the northern hilly region.

Jhilmila Lake, Bedkot Lake, Bandatal, Shovatal, and Vishnu Temple, Ranital are the other tourist attractions.SOUL PEACE

Geography 
The district expands from 28 degrees 38 minutes to 29 degrees 28 minutes Northern latitudes and 80 degrees 03 minutes to 80 degrees 33 minutes Eastern longitudes. It is situated at the end of westmost part of province and country on the corner of the south-west. Geographically it is on the terai, but the northern part of the district has some higher altitudes of elevation. The highest elevation of the district is 1528m, and the lowest is 176m. The main rivers of the region are Mahakali, Jobuda, Chaudhary, Mohana, Syal, Banhara, Sanbora and Doda

Demographics
At the time of the 2011 Nepal census, Kanchanpur District had a population of 451,248. Of these, 39.8% spoke Doteli, 25.5% Tharu, 15.9% Nepali, 5.2% Baitadeli, 4.0% Bajhangi, 2.3% Achhami, 1.6% Magar, 1.5% Bajureli, 1.3% Tamang, 1.1% Darchuleli, 0.4% Hindi, 0.3% Maithili, 0.2% Dailekhi, 0.1% Gurung, 0.1% Newar and 0.2% other languages as their first language. 

In terms of ethnicity/caste, 28.8% were Chhetri, 25.8% Tharu, 16.0% Hill Brahmin, 7.7% Kami, 5.6% Thakuri, 3.8% other Dalit, 2.8% Magar, 2.3% Damai/Dholi, 1.6% Sarki, 1.5% Sanyasi/Dasnami, 1.4% Tamang, 0.6% Lohar, 0.4% Gurung, 0.3% Badi, 0.2% Newar, 0.1% Dhanuk, 0.1% Hajam/Thakur, 0.1% Kathabaniyan, 0.1% Kumal, 0.1% Musalman, 0.1% other Terai and 0.1% others.

In terms of religion, 95.1% were Hindu, 2.7% Christian, 1.1% Buddhist, 0.8% Prakriti, 0.1% Baháʼí, 0.1% Muslim and 0.1% others.

In terms of literacy, 70.5% could read and write, 2.1% could only read and 27.4% could neither read nor write.

Divisions
Kanchanpur district is divided into 7 municipalities and 2 rural municipalities:
Municipalities
Bedkot
Belauri
Bhimdatta
Mahakali
Shuklaphanta
Krishnapur
Punarbas
Rural municipalities
Laljhadi
Beldandi

Communication and media
Websites, Online News Portal, FM Stations and News Papers of Kanchanpur District

MNR Yellow Pages. Local Search Engine
NB Media Network
Suklaphanta FM 99.4 MHz
Radio Mahakali FM 96.2 MHz
Radio Belauri 105 MHz
Belauri Post Weekly
Dishanirdesh Kanchan Post Weekly
Farwest Times
Chure Times
Mahendranagar Post
Abhiyan Daily
Paschim Nepal Daily
Dainik Khabar Daily
New Janakranti Daily
Radio Nagarik FM 104.3 MHz
Radio Rastriya 89.8 MHz
Radio Barasinga 102.2 MHz
Radio Paschim Nepal 91.0 MHz
Radio Kanchanpur 90.2 MHz
Radio Pahichaan FM 105.3 MHz
Radio Sudur Sanchar 100.4 MHz
Radio Jhalari FM 105.9 MHz
Prabhu FM 102.5 MHz

Lakes In Kanchanpur District
Banda lake
Betkot lake
Pyara lake
Jhilmila lake
Shova lake
Shuklaphanta lake
Ranital

References

External links
District Development Committee, Kanchanpur

 
Districts of Nepal established during Rana regime or before
Districts of Nepal established in 1962